Apoda may refer to:

 Apoda (genus), a genus of moths in the family Limacodidae
 Caecilian, a group of limbless, serpentine amphibians
 Greater bird-of-paradise (Paradisaea apoda)